Turn- und Sportgemeinschaft 1899 Hoffenheim e.V., or simply TSG 1899 Hoffenheim or just Hoffenheim is a German professional football club based in Hoffenheim, a village of Sinsheim municipality, Baden-Württemberg.

Originally founded in 1899 as a gymnastics club, Hoffenheim came into being in its modern form in 1945. A fifth division side in 2000, the club rapidly advanced through the German football league system with the financial backing of alumnus and software mogul Dietmar Hopp, and in 2008 Hoffenheim was promoted to the top tier Bundesliga. In the 2017–18 season, Hoffenheim finished third in the Bundesliga (its best to date), qualifying for the UEFA Champions League group stage for the first time.

Since 2009, Hoffenheim has played its home games at the Rhein-Neckar-Arena (currently known as PreZero Arena), having previously played at the Dietmar-Hopp-Stadion from 1999.

History
The modern-day club was formed in 1945, when gymnastics club Turnverein Hoffenheim (founded 1 July 1899) and football club Fußballverein Hoffenheim (founded 1921) merged. At the beginning of the 1990s, the club was an obscure local amateur side playing in the eighth division Baden-Württemberg A-Liga. They steadily improved and by 1996 were competing in the Verbandsliga Nordbaden (V).

Around 2000, alumnus Dietmar Hopp returned to the club of his youth as a financial backer. Hopp was the co-founder of software firm SAP and he put some of his money into the club. His contributions generated almost immediate results: in 2000 Hoffenheim finished first in the Verbandsliga and was promoted to the fourth-division Oberliga Baden-Württemberg. Another first-place finish moved the club up to the Regionalliga Süd (III) for the 2001–02 season. They finished 13th in their first season in the Regionalliga, but improved significantly the next year, earning a fifth-place result.

Hoffenheim earned fifth and seventh-place finishes in the next two seasons, before improving to fourth in 2005–06 to earn their best result to date. The club made its first DFB-Pokal appearance in the 2003–04 competition and performed well, advancing to the quarter-finals by eliminating 2. Bundesliga sides Eintracht Trier and Karlsruher SC and Bundesliga club Bayer Leverkusen before being put out themselves by another 2. Bundesliga side, VfB Lübeck.

Negotiations to merge TSG Hoffenheim, Astoria Walldorf, and SV Sandhausen to create FC Heidelberg 06 in 2005 were abandoned due to the resistance of the latter two clubs, and the failure to agree on whether the new side's stadium should be located in Heidelberg or Eppelheim. Team owner Hopp clearly preferred Heidelberg, but could not overcome the resistance of local firm Wild, which had already reserved the site of the planned stadium for its new production facilities.

2006–2008: Major investments, promotion to the Bundesliga
In 2006, the club sought to improve its squad and technical staff by bringing in players with several years of Bundesliga experience, most notably Jochen Seitz and Tomislav Marić, and young talents like Sejad Salihović, while signing manager Ralf Rangnick, who managed Bundesliga teams such as SSV Ulm 1846, VfB Stuttgart, Hannover 96 and Schalke 04, to a five-year contract. The investment paid off in the 2006–07 season with the club's promotion to the 2. Bundesliga after finishing second in Regionalliga Süd.

The 2007–08 season was Hoffenheim's first season in professional football. After a weak start with three losses and only one draw in the first four games, the team's performance improved remarkably and Hoffenheim climbed from 16th place on matchday four to second place on matchday 23. The team managed to defend their place until the end of the season, having scored 60 points after matchday 34. As a result of their second-place finish, they received automatic promotion to the Bundesliga, the highest tier in German football, after playing in the 2. Bundesliga for just one season.

2008–present: Growth of the club and Champions League football
Hoffenheim had a successful season in their debut in the Bundesliga, the top German division, as they went on to record a 7th place finish. The club's best players of the season were Vedad Ibišević and Demba Ba, who scored 18 and 14 respectively. In the 2009–10 Bundesliga, the club had a less successful season, recording a finish outside of the top 10, finishing 11th. The club eventually went on to finish in 11th place for the next two consecutive seasons. In the 2012–13 Bundesliga, the club came very close to suffering relegation, after they a 16th place finish, meaning they would have to play in the relegation play-offs to survive; the club went on to beat their opponents Kaiserslautern by a scoreline of 5–2 on aggregate, with Roberto Firmino scoring two goals in the first match. In the 2013–14 Bundesliga, the club had strange statistics; being the third best goalscoring team in the league, but also the worst defensive team, scoring 72 goals and conceding 70. The club's best goalscorer of the season, also their best assist provider, was Roberto Firmino, scoring 16 goals and providing 12 assists, with the player winning the Bundesliga Breakthrough Player of the Season award. In the 2014–15 Bundesliga, the club came very close to qualifying for the Europa League, with just two points separating them from Borussia Dortmund, who were in 7th place. Despite the 8th place finish, Hoffenheim still had a goal difference of −6 in the 2014–15 season. In the 2015–16 Bundesliga, the club once again came close to suffering relegation, with just one point separating them from the relegation play-offs.

In the 2016–17 season, new coach Julian Nagelsmann took over, beginning to recruit several very significant players, including Andrej Kramarić, Kerem Demirbay and Sandro Wagner. Initially, the club struggled for form, with four draws in the first four games of the season, before a rise in form rose the club to third place in the league by the end of October. On 4 April 2017, the club beat Bayern Munich by a scoreline of 1–0, one of the most important wins in the club's history. On 21 April 2017, the club confirmed that they would play European football next season following a 1–1 draw with Köln. Following a 4th place finish in the 2016–17 Bundesliga, Hoffenheim confirmed Champions League football for the 2017–18 season. The club were eventually drawn to play six-time European champions Liverpool in the play-off round. The club lost the first leg tie by a scoreline of 1–2, before a 4–2 loss in the second leg confirmed Hoffenheim's elimination from the tournament, as the club lost 3–6 on aggregate. Due to their elimination from the play-off stages, the club would continue playing European football in the Europa League group stages, however, the club would suffer elimination from the tournament as they would finish bottom of their group.

In the 2017–18 Bundesliga season, Hoffenheim had a successful season, finishing third, automatically qualifying for next year's UEFA Champions League.

The 2018–19 season was more disappointing for Hoffenheim, as they finished bottom of their Champions League group with only 3 draws and 3 losses whilst playing against the likes of Manchester City, Lyon and Shakhtar Donetsk. This meant that they did not make it out of the group stages of a European competition again. In the Bundesliga Hoffenheim didn't fare much better, finishing a disappointing 9th place, 6 below their ranking of 3rd during the 2017–18 campaign with 51 points. This was just two places and 3 points away from the Europa League qualifying rounds. In the DFB-Pokal Hoffenheim were eliminated by RB Leipzig in a 2–0 loss with both goals from Timo Werner. The season's top scorer was Andre Kramarić, with the Croatian finding the goal 22 times in 37 appearances. The German Kerem Demirbay was the club's top playmaker with 11 assists during the 2018–19 season. Head coach Julian Nagelsmann left the club to join RB Leipzig at the end of the season. Alfred Schreuder, former assistant coach under Huub Stevens and Julian Nagelsmann was appointed as the new head coach.

Players

Current squad

Players out on loan

Reserve team

Women's team

Staff

First team

Stadium

Before being promoted to the 1. Bundesliga in 2008, the club played in Dietmar-Hopp-Stadion which was built in 1999 with a capacity of 5,000 (1,620 seats).

TSG 1899 Hoffenheim made their loftier ambitions clear in 2006 when the club's management decided to build the new 30,150 seat Rhein-Neckar-Arena suitable for hosting Bundesliga matches. The stadium was originally to be built in Heidelberg before the selection of a site in Sinsheim.

They opened their first season in the 1. Bundesliga at the 26,022 capacity Carl-Benz-Stadion in Mannheim and played their first match in their new stadium on 31 January 2009.

Interwetten betting company had agreed to be the stadium's betting partner for TSG Hoffenheim from August 2017, to 2020.

Controversy

Criticism of the club
Dietmar Hopp's financial support, which transformed Hoffenheim from a local amateur club into a competitive Bundesliga club, has been strongly criticized by other clubs, fans and some in the German press. The main points of criticism are the club's lack of "tradition" and a proper fan base as the club is a historically insignificant side from a village of just 3,300 inhabitants. This situation is similar to that of now-defunct Scottish side Gretna and German clubs VfL Wolfsburg, Bayer Leverkusen and RB Leipzig, as those teams also received large financial support by companies; Wolfsburg is wholly owned and supported by automobile manufacturer Volkswagen, Bayer Leverkusen by pharmaceutical company Bayer and RB Leipzig by Red Bull.

On 16 August 2011, the club released a statement regarding complaints of a loudspeaker that was strategically placed under away fans during a home game against Borussia Dortmund. The loudspeaker was designed to drown out the noise of the away fans cheers and chants during the game. It was reported that the speaker was placed by the groundskeeper, although the club denied any involvement, saying he acted alone. It was also reported that the loudspeaker was used during other games, not just the home game against Dortmund.

In a later statement, the club admitted that the disruptive sound assembly has been used at least five times, although club officials claim to have no knowledge of these measures.

On 29 February 2020, Bayern Munich supporters unfurled an offensive banner aimed at Hoffenheim owner Dietmar Hopp, resulting the game at Hoffenheim to be suspended with less than 15 minutes remaining. After concerns that the game could be abandoned, both teams returned to finish the match, but had decided to just run down the clock to end the game in solidarity with Hopp. Rather than play on, the two sets of players began passing the ball to each other and chatting as if they were teammates.

The very next day, the Bundesliga match between Vfl Wolfsburg and 1. FC Union Berlin was stopped at the 44th minute of play due to derogatory banners being unfurled, one of which showed Hopp under crosshairs. The two teams left the field to return 10 minutes later and play out the remainder of the half and subsequently the game.

Partnership
On 25 September 2020, TSG 1899 Hoffenheim signed a partnership agreement with MLS club FC Cincinnati.

Honours
The club's honours:

League
 2. Bundesliga
 Runners-up: 2007–08
 Regionalliga
 Runners-up: 2006–07
 Oberliga Baden-Württemberg (IV)
 Champions: 2000–01
 Runners-up: 2009–10‡
 Verbandsliga Nordbaden (V)
 Champions: 1999–2000
 Runners-up: 2002–03‡

Cup
 North Baden Cup (Tiers III-VII)
 Winners: 2001–02, 2002–03, 2003–04, 2004–05
 Runners-up: 2006–07

Youth
 German Under 19 championship
 Champions: 2013–14
 Runners-up: 2014–15, 2015–16
 German Under 17 championship
 Champions: 2007–08
Under 19 Bundesliga South/Southwest
 Champions: 2013–14, 2014–15, 2015–16
 Under 17 Bundesliga South/Southwest
 Champions: 2007–08
 Runners-up: 2010–11
 Under 15 Regionalliga Süd
 Champions: 2011–12, 2012–13, 2015–16
 ‡ Won by reserve team.

Coaching history
Recent coaches of the club:

*As caretaker coach.

Recent seasons
The recent season-by-season performance of the club:

Key

 With the introduction of the Regionalligas in 1994 and the 3. Liga in 2008 as the new third tier, below the 2. Bundesliga, all leagues below dropped one tier. In 2012, the number of Regionalligas was increased from three to five with all Regionalliga Süd clubs except the Bavarian ones entering the new Regionalliga Südwest.

European record
Hoffenheim made their debut in European competition in 2017, qualifying for the play-off round of the 2017–18 UEFA Champions League play-offs. Their first match was on 15 August 2017, losing the first leg of the play-offs 2–1 to Liverpool.

Matches

UEFA club coefficient ranking

Top scorers

Women's team

The women's team started playing in 2006–07 and rushed through the lower leagues. The women's team plays at Dietmar-Hopp-Stadion and is currently coached by Jürgen Ehrmann.

References

Literature
Grüne, Hardy (2001). Vereinslexikon. Kassel: AGON Sportverlag

External links

 
Das deutsche Fußball-Archiv historical German domestic league tables 
TSG 1899 Hoffenheim at Weltfussball.de 
TSG 1899 Hoffenheim II at Weltfussball.de 
/ TSG 1899 Hoffenheim at Vkontakte

 
1899 establishments in Germany
Association football clubs established in 1899
Football clubs in Germany
Football clubs in Baden-Württemberg
Bundesliga clubs
Rhein-Neckar-Kreis
2. Bundesliga clubs